Javier Manjarín Pereda (born 31 December 1969) is a Spanish former professional footballer who played as a forward, and is the assistant manager of Racing de Ferrol.

In a 14-year professional career, with speed as his main attribute, he played mainly for Sporting de Gijón (four seasons) and Deportivo de La Coruña (six), also competing in Mexico in his later years.

A Spain international in the mid-to-late 90s, Manjarín represented the country at Euro 1996.

Club career
Born in Gijón, Asturias, Manjarín began playing professionally for local Sporting de Gijón, first appearing with his hometown squad during the 1989–90 campaign (29 games and four goals). Subsequently, he imposed as a La Liga player with Deportivo de La Coruña, being a key attacking element in two runner-up and one third league places while scoring 19 times in his first four years combined.

Subsequent loss of form and injuries prompted a 1999–2000 move to Racing de Santander, where Manjarín somehow resurfaced. After two years, he moved to Mexico and competed in the Liga MX with Atlético Celaya FC; for the following season he remained in Mexico, playing for Club Santos Laguna.

Manjarín retired in 2005 at the age of 35, after one season in the Spanish regional leagues with Atlético Arteixo. In the country's top level alone, he totalled 329 matches and 38 goals through 13 seasons.

International career
Manjarín gained 13 caps for Spain during two years, netting twice and participating at UEFA Euro 1996. His debut came on 6 September 1995, as the national side crushed Cyprus 6–0 in Granada for the continental competition qualifiers.

Previously, Manjarín appeared with the under-23s at the 1992 Summer Olympics, winning gold.

International goals
Scores and results list Spain's goal tally first, score column indicates score after each Manjarín goal.

Honours
Deportivo
Copa del Rey: 1994–95
Supercopa de España: 1995

Spain U23
Summer Olympic Games: 1992

References

External links
 
 Deportivo archives
 
 
 
 

1969 births
Living people
Footballers from Gijón
Spanish footballers
Association football forwards
La Liga players
Segunda División B players
Tercera División players
Colegio de la Inmaculada (Gijón) footballers
Sporting de Gijón B players
Sporting de Gijón players
Deportivo de La Coruña players
Racing de Santander players
Liga MX players
Atlético Celaya footballers
Santos Laguna footballers
Spain youth international footballers
Spain under-21 international footballers
Spain under-23 international footballers
Spain international footballers
UEFA Euro 1996 players
Olympic footballers of Spain
Footballers at the 1992 Summer Olympics
Olympic medalists in football
Medalists at the 1992 Summer Olympics
Olympic gold medalists for Spain
Spanish expatriate footballers
Expatriate footballers in Mexico
Spanish expatriate sportspeople in Mexico
Colegio de la Inmaculada (Gijón) alumni